Karlos Filiga (né McNichol; born 16 October 1988 in Wellington, New Zealand) is a former professional rugby league footballer who played for Cronulla-Sutherland in the National Rugby League (NRL) competition.

Early life
Filiga was born in New Zealand. His father is Australian and his mother is Samoan.  Filiga changed his last name from McNichol to his mother's maiden name of Filiga.

Playing career
In 2007, Filiga was labelled by his manager as "the next Sonny Bill Williams".

Cronulla won a bidding war in late 2007 for Filiga, committing to a A$600,000 contract over three years. Filiga, previously a Bulldogs junior playing for the Chester Hill Hornets, didn't make his debut in first-grade in 2007 as he spent most of the season sidelined with chest and foot injuries.

In 2008, the first year of his three-year Cronulla contract, Filiga's NRL appearances were limited by his form. He spent only 11 minutes on the field in the NRL, playing off the bench in a match against Penrith in round 13.

Cronulla Sharks released Filiga on "compassionate grounds" in April 2009.

Filiga then went to play for the Wentworthville Magpies, who are the feeder club for the Parramatta Eels NRL Side.

As of 2017, Filiga plays for The Cooma Stallions.

References

External links
Sharks profile
 

1988 births
Living people
Cronulla-Sutherland Sharks players
New Zealand rugby league players
New Zealand sportspeople of Samoan descent
Rugby league centres
Rugby league players from Wellington City
Wentworthville Magpies players